Shia Islam in Senegal is practiced small number of Senegalese people, as well as by the Lebanese community in Senegal.

Background
According to historian Alioune Badiane, Shia Islam has been present in Senegal for many centuries, and can be traced back to the Idrisid Dynasty.

Unlike Shia Islam in Nigeria, in Senegal Shia Islam has generally coexisted peacefully with the dominant Sunni Islam branches and the Senegalese government.

Shia Islam is the primary religion of the Lebanese community in Senegal, which has been established in Senegal for over a century. It is also practiced by a growing number of native Senegalese, including the Wolof and Fula peoples. Since the 1970s, the number of native Shi'i Senegalese has steadily increased in both urban and rural areas.

Lebanese community
Lebanese have historically formed economically dominant communities in West Africa, including in Senegal. The Lebanese community in Senegal was established around the turn of the 20th century. Hence, many Lebanese in Senegal were born outside Lebanon, do not hold Lebanese citizenship, and have never been to Lebanon.

Unlike Shia Islam in some other Islamic countries, Shia Islam in Senegal has not experienced significant conflicts with the state or with other branches of Islam. Rather, in Senegal, Shia Islam organizations and leaders have focused much more on social development, education, and charity.

Anthropological studies
Mara A. Leichtman, an American anthropologist at Michigan State University, has spent over a decade carrying out fieldwork on Shia Islam and Sufism in Senegal, and has published various books and papers on her fieldwork. Leichtman distinguishes between the form of Shia Islam practiced by the Lebanese community in Senegal, as well as an "indigenous African Shi'ism" growing in popularity among local Senegalese.

Leichtman has also conducted anthropological studies of major Shia organizations in Senegal such as the Mozdahir International Institute, headed by Senegalese Shi'i religious leader Cherif Mohamed Aly Aidara. According to Leichtman (2017), Mozdahir's various rural development projects help bridge the urban-rural divide among Shi'i Muslims in Senegal, and have helped to increase the number of Shi'i Muslims in Senegal.

See also

Islam in Senegal
Religion in Senegal
Mozdahir
Lebanese people in Senegal
Darou Hidjiratou

Further reading
Books
Leichtman, Mara A. (2015).  Shi‘i Cosmopolitanisms in Africa: Lebanese Migration and Religious Conversion in Senegal. Bloomington: Indiana University Press, Public Cultures of the Middle East and North Africa series.
Leichtman, Mara A. and Mamadou Diouf. (2009). New Perspectives on Islam in Senegal: Conversion, Migration, Wealth, Power and Femininity. New York: Palgrave Macmillan.

Book chapters
Leichtman, Mara A. (2012). “The Africanization of Ashura in Senegal,” in Lloyd Ridgeon, ed., Shi‘ism and Identity: Religion, Politics and Change in the Global Muslim Community, London: I.B. Tauris 2012, pp. 144-169.
Leichtman, Mara A. (2010). “Shi‘a Lebanese Migrants and Senegalese Converts in Dakar,” in Sabrina Mervin, ed., The Shi‘a Worlds and Iran, London: Saqi Books in association with Institut Français du Proche-Orient, 2010, pp. 215-251.
Leichtman, Mara A. (2008). “The Intricacies of Being Senegal’s Lebanese Shi’ite Sheikh,” in Frances Trix, John Walbridge and Linda Walbridge, eds, Muslim Voices and Lives in the Contemporary World, New York: Palgrave Macmillan, 2008, pp. 85-100.

Articles
Diop, Macoumba (2013). L'introduction du chiisme au Sénégal. In Histoire, monde et cultures religieuses 2013/4 (n° 28), pages 63-77.

References

External links
Mozdahir International Institute

Senegal
Islam in Senegal